The Arizona Wildcats women's basketball program is the official women's basketball program at the University of Arizona in Tucson, Arizona. Basketball is one of eleven women's sports at the University of Arizona. The team is a Division I member of the National Collegiate Athletic Association (NCAA) and the Pac-12 athletic conference. The team's home venue is the McKale Center, which seats 14,545 fans. The official team colors are cardinal red and navy blue. The Wildcats have qualified for eight NCAA Tournaments.

For most of its history, the women’s basketball program has been playing in the shadow of its men’s counterpart, leading to many losing seasons. However, in recent years, the women’s team has been improving their success in winning, mostly due to coaching regime and talent, and captured the Women’s National Invitational Tournament (WNIT) championship in 2019. They made the Final Four for the first time in 2021 and defeated UConn to qualify for the National Championship game. They would lose to Stanford in the National Championship.

Program history 
Female students at the University of Arizona first requested a women's basketball team in 1912, but were denied. Women played "inter-class" games for the first time in 1921. The juniors won. The following year, the school organized games with players from sororities and dormitories. Intercollegiate competition began in 1923, and a "Varsity" team played Arizona State University. This system persisted until 1971, when the UA joined the Association of Intercollegiate Athletics for Women (AIAW) as a charter member.

The team was a member of the Intermountain Conference. The University of Arizona Athletic Department cites the first official season of women's basketball at the University of Arizona as the 1972–73 season, following the Title IX federal legislation that requires state-supported institutions to offer equal opportunity to men's and women's programs. The team finished their first season with a winning 8–4 record. In 1979, the University of Arizona, along with Arizona State University and five schools in southern California joined to form the Western Collegiate Athletic Association.

The team became a member of the NCAA in 1981, when the NCAA absorbed the AIAW. In 1985, the school joined the Pacific-West Conference, which became the Pac-10 the following season and the Pac-12 in 2011. As of the outset of the 2015–16 season, the all-time team record was 537–642. The Wildcats were runners-up at the Pac-10 Conference championship tournament in 2003 and 2004, marking their most successful conference finishes. The team made appearances in the NCAA Tournament in 1997, 1998, 1999, 2000, 2003, 2004, 2005 and 2021 and in the Women's National Invitational Tournament in 1996, 2001, 2011, and 2019, while winning it all in 1996 and 2019.

In 2021, the team beat UConn in the Final Four of the NCAA Women’s Basketball championship. They lost the championship game against Stanford 53–54.

Season-by-season results 
Sources:

Playing abroad 
The Wildcats have played in Australia, France, Puerto Rico, and Italy.

NCAA tournament results
The Wildcats have appeared in the NCAA Tournament nine times. Their combined record is 12–9.

See also 
 Arizona Wildcats men's basketball

References

External links